Kieran John Trippier (born 19 September 1990) is an English professional footballer who plays as a right-back for  club Newcastle United and the England national team.

Trippier started his career in the youth system at Manchester City but failed to make the breakthrough to the first team, having two loans at Championship club Barnsley. In 2011, he signed for Championship club Burnley on a season-long loan which was made permanent in January 2012 for an undisclosed fee. He was named in the Championship PFA Team of the Year for two consecutive seasons in 2012–13 and 2013–14. In 2014, he secured promotion with Burnley to the Premier League as the team finished runners-up in the Championship. A year later, he signed for Tottenham Hotspur for a £3.5 million fee. After four years in North London, during which he became part of the squad that finished as runners-up in the 2019 Champions League final, Trippier joined Spanish side Atlético Madrid, where he helped the team win the 2020–21 La Liga title. 

Trippier also represented England at all levels from under-18 to under-21, featuring in the 2009 UEFA European Under-19 Championship and 2009 FIFA U-20 World Cup. He made his senior international debut in June 2017 and was part of the team that reached the semi-finals of the 2018 FIFA World Cup.

Early life
Trippier was born in Bury, Greater Manchester, to Chris Trippier and Eleanor Lomax. His father is mixed race. Trippier has three brothers, Chris, Curtis and Kelvin. He grew up in Summerseat in Ramsbottom, Greater Manchester, and attended Holcombe Brook Primary School until 2002, followed by Woodhey High School where he studied for five years and finished in 2007. He played in the school football team and helped them win the Bury Cup twice and Greater Manchester Trophy once. His family are Manchester United fans, and although he was scouted by United when he was eight, he chose to join Manchester City's academy as he knew a few friends there and it was local for him.

Club career

Manchester City
Trippier joined Manchester City's academy at the age of nine, where he progressed through the ranks at the club, signing his first professional contract in 2007. In the 2007–08 season he became a regular in the reserve team and was part of the team that won the FA Youth Cup. In August 2009, he featured in the prestige friendly against FC Barcelona at the Camp Nou. He joined the first team for the pre-season tour of the United States in the summer of 2010.

Loans to Barnsley
In February 2010, he joined Championship club Barnsley on a one-month loan. He went on to make three appearances during the loan spell, making his debut in a 2–1 defeat at Middlesbrough. His loan was cut short after he suffered an injury at Scunthorpe United which kept him out for ten days. In August 2010, he re-joined Barnsley for his second spell with the club on a six-month loan deal. He made his second debut for the club in the 1–0 home defeat to Rochdale in the League Cup. In January 2011, Trippier agreed a deal to stay at Barnsley for the remainder of the 2010–11 season. He scored his first senior goal for Barnsley in a 3–3 draw with Leeds United, with a curling free-kick from 25 yards out at Elland Road in February 2011. His second goal came against local rivals Doncaster Rovers with another spectacular free-kick, equalising late on for the hosts at Oakwell. He went on to make forty-one appearances in all competitions, winning the Young Player of the Year award.

Burnley

In July 2011, Trippier joined Championship club Burnley on a season-long loan as a replacement for the departing Tyrone Mears. He made his debut for the Clarets in August 2011, a 2–2 home draw with Watford. His first goal for the club came in September 2011, with a superb long-range free-kick against Milton Keynes Dons in a 2–1 win in the League Cup. His first league goal came in December 2011, a 1–0 win over Brighton & Hove Albion at the Falmer Stadium, with a powerful shot from the edge of the box. In December 2011, after impressing during his loan, Trippier was nominated for the Championship Player of the Month award. On 2 January 2012, he received his first professional red card for picking up two bookings in a 2–1 defeat to Leeds United. A day later, Burnley signed Trippier on a permanent deal for an undisclosed fee, signing a three-and-a-half-year contract. In January 2012 he scored his second goal for the club, scoring from range in a 2–0 win away to Middlesbrough. In March 2012, he scored the first in a 5–1 rout against Portsmouth at Fratton Park. He played in all 46 league games in his first season as the club finished in mid-table, going on to win the Burnley Player of the Year award.

Trippier again went on to impress in his second season with the club being a virtual ever-present as he was named in the Championship PFA Team of the Year for 2012–13. In August 2013, he scored a free-kick in a 2–0 win over Preston North End in the League Cup. In January 2014, he sealed a 3–2 win over Huddersfield Town with a late goal. He was again named in the Championship PFA Team of the Year for consecutive seasons as Burnley finished runners-up and gained promotion to the Premier League. In May 2014, he signed a new improved three-year contract until 2017 after reported interest from Arsenal.

Tottenham Hotspur

2015–16 season
On 19 June 2015, Trippier signed for Premier League club Tottenham for a reported £3.5 million, after successfully passing a medical, becoming the club's second signing of the summer. Trippier was expected to compete with Kyle Walker at right-back under manager Mauricio Pochettino, and he did not make a start for Tottenham before Christmas as he was eased into the team. On 6 February 2016, he scored his first goal for Tottenham, netting a cross from Dele Alli, which turned out to be the winning goal in a 1–0 win over Watford. Trippier appeared in six games for Tottenham during the Premier League season, making five starts as Walker displayed his best form in recent years. However, Trippier played in every minute of Tottenham's Europa League campaign that reached the last 16.

2016–17 season
Despite rumours of a move to Southampton, Trippier confirmed he was "really happy at the club" and that he was "not thinking of leaving". Trippier made his Champions League debut in a Group stage match at CSKA Moscow on 27 September 2016. He performed well in the right-back position as replacement for Kyle Walker who was injured during the 2016–17 season, and earned his first call-up for the England national squad.

2017–18 season
On 30 June 2017, Trippier agreed a new five-year contract, committing to the club until 2022. As Walker had moved to Manchester City in the summer, Trippier became a regular in the starting line-up of the Spurs team early in the 2017–18 season, although he missed the opening game of the season due to an injury sustained in a pre-season friendly against Juventus that Spurs won 2–1. However, a new signing for Tottenham this season, Serge Aurier, in September meant that he and Aurier regularly rotated in the right-back position. He impressed with his performances in the season, in particular during the UEFA Champions League home match against Real Madrid on 1 November 2017, which Spurs won 3–1.

2018–19 season
Trippier made his first start in the 2018–19 season in the game against Fulham, and scored his first goal of the season from a free kick. However, it was generally considered that he had a disappointing season, after suffering from a series of minor injuries, as well as having committed a number of defensive errors. In a match against rivals Chelsea, he scored an own goal, in an attempt to pass the ball to goalkeeper Hugo Lloris. His goal made the scoreline 2–0 to Chelsea, which was also the final result of the game. He left Tottenham at the end of the season, having made 114 appearances for the club in all competitions.

Atlético Madrid

Trippier signed for La Liga club Atlético Madrid on 17 July 2019 on a three-year contract, for a fee of £20 million plus add-ons. He became Atlético's first English player in 95 years. In his debut on 18 August in their opening La Liga match against Getafe, he helped the team to a 1–0 home win by providing an assist for Álvaro Morata's goal. In December 2020, Trippier was given a 10-week worldwide football ban and fined £70,000 for four breaches of Football Association betting rules after he allegedly passed on information on his transfer to his friends who then placed bets on his transfer. The ban was suspended by FIFA, which dismissed its appeal, until the case is decided by the Court of Arbitration for Sport (CAS). CAS rejected the appeal, and Trippier sat out his ban until his return to the team for the Madrid Derby against Real Madrid on 7 March 2021, which ended in a 1–1 draw.

At the end of the 2020–21 season, Trippier won his first major trophy as Atlético secured the La Liga title on the final day of the season.

Newcastle United
Trippier signed for Premier League club Newcastle United on 7 January 2022 on a two-and-a-half-year contract for a fee of £12 million plus add-ons. He made his debut on 8 January, in the 1–0 defeat to Cambridge United in the FA Cup. On 8 February, Trippier scored his first goal for Newcastle United, a free kick in a 3–1 win at home to Everton.

On 13 February 2022, after scoring a second goal for the club, also a free kick, in a 1–0 home win against Aston Villa, Trippier broke his foot. The news was described as "disastrous" for the club by pundit and former player Jermaine Jenas, and the club said they were unsure if Trippier would feature again that season. He would finish the season with 6 appearances and 2 goals for Newcastle in the Premier League.

In the 2022-23 season, Trippier was a key member of the Newcastle team that reached third place in the Premier League at the November break, receiving regular praise from pundits for both his defensive and creative skills. The team conceded fewer goals than any other club, but Trippier was also in the top 3 of all players for chances created and crosses delivered.

On 27 January 2023, he signed a contract extension until the summer of 2025.

International career

Youth
Trippier was first called up by England at under-18 level in November 2007 for a friendly against Ghana at the Priestfield Stadium, Gillingham. He made his debut in the 2–0 victory, coming on as a late substitute for Seth Nana Twumasi.

He then progressed to the under-19 squad in November 2008 for the 2009 UEFA European Under-19 Championship qualification match against Albania, making his debut in the 3–0 win in Coleraine, Northern Ireland. He was a mainstay in the team as the squad qualified for the 2009 UEFA European Under-19 Championship finals in Ukraine, and was named in the squad for the finals of the tournament. He featured heavily in the tournament as England reached the final but were beaten 2–0 by the hosts Ukraine.

After reaching the final, England qualified for the 2009 FIFA U-20 World Cup in Egypt a month later and Trippier was named in the 21-man squad. He featured in all three games as England were eliminated finishing bottom of the group with defeats to Uruguay and Ghana, and the 1–1 draw with Uzbekistan. In October 2010, he received his first call-up to the under-21 squad for the 2011 UEFA European Under-21 Championship play-off against Romania, however he failed to feature. He made his debut a month later in the friendly with Germany, a 2–0 defeat. His final appearance for the under-21s came in a friendly against Italy in February 2011 at the Stadio Carlo Castellani in Empoli. He came on as a second-half substitute for Josh McEachran in a 1–0 defeat.

Senior

Trippier was called up to the senior team for the first time in May 2017 for the 2018 World Cup qualifier against Scotland and the friendly match against France, making his debut against the latter on 13 June in a 3–2 defeat.

He was named in the 23-man England national team squad for the 2018 FIFA World Cup. On 11 July 2018, Trippier scored his first England goal, opening the scoring with a free-kick in a 2–1 extra-time loss to Croatia in Moscow in the semi-final. He was injured in extra time with all substitutions played, so England played the final ten minutes with ten men. He was widely praised as one of the best performers for the England team at the World Cup, particularly for his crosses and dead-ball delivery on set pieces, prompting comparison with David Beckham. He was ranked the most creative player of the tournament, having created 24 chances in all games played.

On 1 June 2021 Trippier was named in the 26-man squad for the rescheduled UEFA Euro 2020, playing in the final against Italy at Wembley, Trippier provided an assist for Luke Shaw to score in the second minute of the match. It would prove to be England's only goal as the match went on to end 1–1 after extra time and Italy would triumph on penalties.

On 10 November 2022, Trippier was named in the 26-man England squad for the 2022 FIFA World Cup.

Personal life
Trippier has a brother, Kelvin Lomax, who also played professional football but used his mother's surname in his professional career. In June 2016, Trippier married his partner Charlotte in Cyprus. Their son was born in 2016, and their daughter in 2019.

Career statistics

Club

International

England score listed first, score column indicates score after each Trippier goal

Honours
Manchester City Youth
FA Youth Cup: 2007–08

Tottenham Hotspur
UEFA Champions League runner-up: 2018–19

Atlético Madrid
La Liga: 2020–21

Newcastle United
EFL Cup runner-up: 2022–23

England U19
UEFA European Under-19 Championship runner-up: 2009

England
UEFA European Championship runner-up: 2020

Individual
Barnsley Young Player of the Year: 2010–11
Burnley Player of the Year: 2011–12
PFA Team of the Year: 2012–13 Championship, 2013–14 Championship

References

External links

Profile at the Newcastle United F.C. website
Profile at the Football Association website

1990 births
Living people
Footballers from Bury, Greater Manchester
English footballers
Association football defenders
Manchester City F.C. players
Barnsley F.C. players
Burnley F.C. players
Tottenham Hotspur F.C. players
Atlético Madrid footballers
Newcastle United F.C. players
English Football League players
Premier League players
La Liga players
England youth international footballers
England under-21 international footballers
England international footballers
2018 FIFA World Cup players
UEFA Euro 2020 players
2022 FIFA World Cup players
English expatriate footballers
Expatriate footballers in Spain
English expatriate sportspeople in Spain
Sportspeople involved in betting scandals
Black British sportsmen